Cinisello Balsamo is a comune (municipality) of about 75,200 inhabitants in the Metropolitan City of Milan in the Italian region of Lombardy, about  northeast of Milan city center.

Cinisello Balsamo borders the following municipalities: Monza, Muggiò, Nova Milanese, Paderno Dugnano, Cusano Milanino, Sesto San Giovanni, Bresso.

The current comune was formed in 1928 by the union of Cinisello and Balsamo, and received the honorary title of city through a presidential decree on 17 October 1972.

History
Until the late 1920s, Cinisello and Balsamo were two separate municipalities. By royal decree, on 13 September 1928 a merger was arranged to form the current common.

As a symbol, the emblem of the city now encompasses those of the two municipalities merged: the emblem of the pastoral and the sword on a red field in fact belongs to Balsamo, the rampant crowned lion on a blue field belongs to Cinisello.

Name
Cinisello (from the Latin cinis, "Ashes", through cinixellum, indicating the fertility of the land from the ashen color, but traditional, though not exactly confirmed - even if you have found Roman remains in the area - is the theory that "Cinisello" comes from "Cinis Aelii", "Ash of Aelius", a Roman gens had here, probably, a branch of the Imperial Age) is the western part of the city.

In another theory (also not exactly confirmed) resulting from studies done in the Historical Archive of Arms would be that both Cini, both Sello, were ancient and noble Houses from Trentino who settled in the area, providing their names to the same, which were decorated with the title of nobility with special merit achieved for works done in favor of the Fatherland. Balsamo (perhaps "the balsam tree", but it might just be the surname of a noble family and elders of the town in the Middle Ages) is the eastern half.

Main sights

 Church of Sant'Ambrogio (17th century) in Cinisello
 Small church of Sant'Eusebio, dating from Lombard times
 Shrine of St. Martin Bishop (16th century)
 Church of San Martino (16th century) in Balsamo
 Villa Ghirlanda Silva Cipelletti (16th century) with one of the first Landscape garden in Italy, designed by count Ercole Silva in the early of 19th century
 Gramsci Square is the main square in Cinisello, which is overlooked by the Church of St. Ambrogio and Villa Arconati.
 Church of Saint Pio X (1958)
 Church of Saint Joseph worker (1957)
 Church of Saint Peter (1968)
 Church of Sacred Family (1965)
 Church of Santa Margherita (1961)
 Church of San Bernardino

People 

 Carino of Balsamo, beatified  Dominican lay brother
 Carlo Oriani, (1888) cyclist
 Valerio Ruggeri, (1934) voice actor
 Ernesto Castano, (1939) footballer
 Pierino Prati, (1946) footballer and coach
 Gaetano Scirea, (1953) footballer and coach
 Marco Veronese, (1976) footballer and coach
 Roberto Cammarelle, (1980) boxer
 Sfera Ebbasta, (1992) rapper
 Luciano Spinelli, (2000) actor and Internet personality

International relations
Twin towns:
 Mazzarino, Italy

See also

 Borgo Misto
 Crocetta (Cinisello Balsamo)
 Villa Rachele
 SS36
 Province of Milan
 Lombardy
 Lombards

References

External links

 Official website

Cities and towns in Lombardy